Vajrasattva (Tibetan: རྡོ་རྗེ་སེམས་དཔའ། Dorje Sempa, short form is རྡོར་སེམས། Dorsem, Монгол: Доржсэмбэ) is a bodhisattva in the Mahayana, Mantrayana/Vajrayana Buddhist traditions. In Chinese Buddhism and the Japanese Shingon tradition, Vajrasatva is the esoteric aspect of the bodhisattva Samantabhadra and is commonly associated with the student practitioner who through the master's teachings, attains an ever-enriching subtle and rarefied grounding in their esoteric practice. In Tibetan Buddhism Vajrasatva is associated with the sambhogakāya and purification practice.

Vajrasatva appears principally in two Buddhists texts: the Mahavairocana Sutra and the Vajrasekhara Sutra. In the Diamond Realm Mandala, Vajrasatva sits to the East near Akshobhya Buddha.

In some esoteric lineages, Nagarjuna was said to have met Vajrasatva in an iron tower in South India, and was taught tantra, thus transmitting the esoteric teachings to more historical figures.

Meaning of name
Vajrasatva's name translates to Diamond Being or Thunderbolt Being. The vajra is an iconic marker for Esoteric Buddhism.

Newar Buddhism
Vajrasattva is an important figure in the tantric Buddhism of the Newar People  of the Kathmandu Valley. The  (100 syllable prayer to Vajrasattva) is memorized by many practicing Newar Buddhist priests.

East Asian Buddhism

In Chinese Buddhism and Shingon, Vajrasatva is traditionally viewed as the second patriarch of Esoteric Buddhism, the first being Vairocana Buddha. According to Kukai's writings in Record of the Dharma Transmission he relates a story based on Amoghavajra's account that Nagarjuna met Vajrasatva in an iron tower in southern India. Vajrasatva initiated Nagarjuna into the abhiseka ritual and entrusted him with the esoteric teachings he had learned from Vairocana Buddha, as depicted in the Mahavairocana Sutra. Kukai does not elaborate further on Vajrasatva or his origins.

Elsewhere, Vajrasatva is an important figure in two esoteric Buddhist sutras, the Mahavairocana Sutra and the Vajrasekhara Sutra. In the first chapter of the Mahavairocana Sutra, Vajrasatva leads a host of beings who visit Vairocana Buddha to learn the Dharma. Vajrasatva inquires about the cause, goal and foundation of all-embracing wisdom, which leads to a philosophical discourse delivered by the Buddha. The audience cannot comprehend the teaching, so the Buddha demonstrates through the use of mandala. Vajrasatva then questions why rituals and objects are needed if the truth is beyond form. Vairocana Buddha replies to Vajrasatva that these are expedient means whose function is to bring practitioners to awakening more readily, and so on. In Shingon Buddhist rituals for initiation; the kechien kanjō; the initiate re-enacts the role of Vajrasatva and recites mantra and dialogue from the sutras above. The Mahācārya enacts the role of Mahavairocana Buddha, bestowing wisdom upon the student.

In certain esoteric Chinese Buddhist rituals such as the Grand Mengshan Food Bestowal ceremony and the Samadhi Water Repentance Ceremony, Vajrasatta's mantra is commonly recited as part of the liturgy while the performing monastic uses ritual vajras and ghantas to expel demons from the ritual platform.

Tibetan Buddhism
In Tibetan Buddhism the Vajrasattva root tantra is Dorje Gyan, or "Vajra Ornament". Vajrasattva practices are common to all of the four schools of Tibetan Buddhism and are used both to purify obscurations so that the Vajrayana student can progress beyond Ngondro practices to the various yoga practices of tantra and also to purify any broken samaya vows after initiation. As such, Vajrasattva practice is an essential element of Tibetan Buddhist practice.

In addition to personal practice, the Vajrasattva mantra is regarded as having the ability to purify karma, bring peace, and cause enlightened activity in general. Following the September 11, 2001 attacks on the United States, The Dzogchen Ponlop Rinpoche announced a project, Prayer 4 Peace, to accumulate one billion six syllable Vajrasattva recitations from practitioners around the world. The six syllable mantra (oṁ Vajrasattva Hūṁ), is a less formal version of the one hundred syllable mantra on which it is based but contains the essential spiritual points of the longer mantra, according to lama and tulku Jamgon Kongtrul.

Dzogchen
"The Mirror of the Heart of Vajrasatva" is one of the Seventeen Tantras of Dzogchen Upadesha.

Samantabhadra discourses to Vajrasattva and in turn Vajrasattva asks questions of Samantabhadra in clarification in the Kulayaraja Tantra or "The All-Creating King Tantra", the main tantra of the Mind Series of Dzogchen.

Consorts
Vajrasattva is often depicted with various consorts: the peaceful one Vajragarvi aka Vajrasatvātmikā (Tib. ), Dharmadhatvishvari, Ghantapani ("Bell Bearer"), the wrathful one Diptacakra, Vajratopa, Vajrabhrikuti, and others.

Hundred Syllable Mantra
In Tibetan Vajrayana Buddhist practice, Vajrasattva is used in the Ngondro, or preliminary practices, in order to purify the mind's defilements, prior to undertaking more advanced tantric techniques. The , the "Hundred Syllable Mantra" supplication of Vajrasattva, approaches universality in the various elementary Ngondro sadhana for sadhakas of all Mantrayana and Sarma schools bar the Bonpo. The pronunciation and orthography differ between lineages.

The evocation of the Hundred Syllable Vajrasattva Mantra in the Vajrayana lineage of Jigme Lingpa's (1729–1798) ngondro from the Longchen Nyingtig displays Sanskrit-Tibetan hybridization. Such textual and dialectical diglossia is evident from the earliest transmission of tantra into the region, where the original Sanskrit phonemes and lexical items are often orthographically rendered in the Tibetan, rather than the comparable indigenous terms (Davidson, 2002). Though Jigme Lingpa did not compose the Hundred Syllable Mantra, his scribal style bears a marked similarity to it as evidenced by his biographies (Gyatso, 1998). Jigme Lingpa as pandit, which in the Himalayan context denotes an indigenous Tibetan versed in Sanskrit, often wrote in a hybridized Sanskrit-Tibetan diglossia.

In Chinese Buddhism, the "Hundred Syllable Mantra" is also recited and practiced by monastics during the Yogacara Flaming Mouth Ritual (Chinese: 瑜伽焰口; pinyin: Yújiā Yànkou), which is often conducted during various important festivals, including the Chinese Ghost Festival, in order to feed pretas and reduce their suffering. The earliest known reference to this mantra in the Chinese Buddhist canon dates to a compilation of spells purportedly made during by monks from the Xixia kingdom during the Song dynasty (960 - 1279), which may indicate that the mantra was first transcribed from Tibetan Buddhist sources, as Tibetan Buddhist teachings were influential in the Xixia region at the time.

ཨོཾ་
བཛྲ་སཏྭ་ས་མ་ཡ་མ་ནུ་པཱ་ལ་ཡ།
བཛྲ་སཏྭ་ཏྭེ་ནོ་པ་ཏིཥྛཱ།
དྲྀ་ཌྷོ་མེ་བྷ་ཝ།
སུ་ཏོ་ཥྱོ་མེ་བྷ་ཝ།
སུ་པོ་ཥྱོ་མེ་བྷ་ཝ།
ཨ་ནུ་རཀྟོ་མེ་བྷ་ཝ།
སརྦ་སིདྡྷིམྨེ་པྲ་ཡ་ཙྪ།
སརྦ་ཀརྨ་སུ་ཙ་མེ ཙིཏྟཾ་ཤཱི་ཡཾ་ཀུ་རུ་ཧཱུྃ།
ཧ་ཧ་ཧ་ཧ་ཧོཿ
བྷ་ག་ཝཱན
སརྦ ཏ་ཐཱ་ག་ཏ་བཛྲ་མ་མེ་མུཉྩ།
བཛྲི་བྷ་ཝ་མ་ཧཱ་ས་མ་ཡ་སཏྭ ཨཱཿ །།

ཧཱུྂ ཕཊ༔

Oṃ
Vajrasattva samayamanu(10)pālaya!  |
Vajrasattva, tvenopa(20)tiṣṭḥa!  |

Dṛḍho me bhava!  |
Sutoṣyo (30) me bhava!  |

Supoṣyo me bhava!  |
A(40)nurakto me bhava!  |
Sarva siddhim (50) me prayaccha!  |
Sarva karmasu ca (60).
Me cittaṃ śrīyaṃ kuru hūṃ!  |
Ha ha (70) ha ha hoḥ!

Bhagavān
sarva tathā(80)gata vajra mā me muñca!  |
Vajri (90) bhava mahāsamaya sattva āḥ! (100) ||

唵:
斡指囉薩埵
薩摩耶 摩奴巴拉耶!
斡指囉薩埵 堆耨缽諦使他!
得哩投 美 帕瓦!
蘇抖使猶 美 帕瓦!
蘇波使猶 美 帕瓦!
阿奴囉克兜 美 帕瓦!
薩哩斡 西梃 美 頗囉 耶察!
薩哩斡 葛爾摩蘇 者! 美 支蕩 釋哩樣 古嚕 吽!
訶 訶 訶訶 斛!
頗葛灣 薩爾瓦 答塔葛達 斡指囉, 媽 美 捫札!
斡指哩 帕瓦 ! 摩哈 薩摩耶 薩埵 啊！

Ǎn

Wòzīluōsàduǒ  Sūsàmáyé Mánàbālàyé |
Wòzīluōsàduǒ Dìnúbōdìsèzhā |
Délīchú Mí Fāwǎ |
Sūdùshù Mí Fāwǎ |
Anúluōyìdōu Mí Fāwǎ |
Sūbùshù Mí Fāwǎ |
Sàlīwò Xiētí Mí Bùluōyécā |
Sàlīwò Gélīmásū Zā Mí
Jìdá Shìlīyáng Guōlǔ Hōng |
Hē Hē Hē Hē Hú

Fāgéwān
Sàlīwǎ Dátǎgédá Wòzīluō Má Mí Ménzā |
Wòzīlī Fāwǎ Máhē Sàmóyé Sàduǒ A ||

oṃ

O Vajrasattva honour the agreement!
Reveal yourself as the vajra-being!
Be steadfast for me!
Be very pleased for me!
Be fully nourishing for me!
Be passionate for me!
Grant me all success and attainment!
And in all actions make my mind more lucid!
hūṃ
ha ha ha ha hoḥ
O Blessed One, vajra of all those in that state, don't abandon me!
O being of the great contract be a vajra-bearer!
āḥ

See also 
 Ritual purification

References

External links 

Rangjung Yeshe Dictionary entry
Samye Institute Library entry
Video of a segment of a Chinese Yogacara Flaming Mouth ceremony (瑜伽焰口法會) where Vajrasattva's mantra "Oṃ Vajrasattva Hūṃ" is recited (at around the 10 second mark)
Video of a segment of a Samadhi Water Repentance ceremony in Taiwan where Vajrasattva's mantra "Oṃ Vajrasattva Hūṃ" is recited (at around the 20:17 minute mark)
Video of a segment of a Chinese Yogacara Flaming Mouth ceremony (瑜伽焰口法會) showing recitation of Vajrasattva's Hundred Syllable Mantra

Bodhisattvas